Mareno Philyaw (born December 19, 1977) is a former American football wide receiver who played two seasons with the Atlanta Falcons of the National Football League. He was drafted by the Atlanta Falcons in the sixth round of the 2000 NFL Draft. Philyaw played college football at Troy University and attended North Clayton High School in College Park, Georgia. He was also a member of the Carolina Panthers, Dallas Desperados, Saskatchewan Roughriders, Montgomery Maulers, and Birmingham Steeldogs. Philyaw served as coach of the Atlanta Ravens of the Independent Women's Football League.

References

External links
Just Sports Stats
Fanbase profile

Living people
1977 births
Players of American football from Atlanta
American football wide receivers
Canadian football wide receivers
African-American players of American football
African-American players of Canadian football
African-American coaches of American football
Troy Trojans football players
Atlanta Falcons players
Carolina Panthers players
Dallas Desperados players
Saskatchewan Roughriders players
Montgomery Maulers players
Alabama Steeldogs players
Players of Canadian football from Atlanta
Indoor American football coaches
21st-century African-American sportspeople
20th-century African-American sportspeople